"'Dendron" (δένδρον) is the Greek word for "tree". Most, but not all, other uses of the name are derived from that meaning. It can refer to:

Place names
Dendron, Cumbria: a small English village/hamlet containing a well known church.
Dendron, Limpopo, South Africa
Dendron, Virginia, USA: a small town of about 300 people.
Mega Dendron, Greek village, birthplace of Cosmas of Aetolia

People
An alias of musician Merv Pepler, one half of Eat Static.
Dendron, Band, all female rock band from Germany

Other
Dendrite: the (usually) postsynaptic branch of a neuron that carries postsynaptic potentials toward the cell body
 In biochemistry, a dendron is the reduced form of its original dendrimer